is a city located in Tokushima Prefecture, Japan. , the city had an estimated population of 54,989 in 26,206 households and a population density of 410 persons per km².

Geography
Naruto is located in the northeastern tip of Tokushima Prefecture on the island of Shikoku. It is bordered by the Seto Inland Sea to the north and the Kii Channel to the east and faces Awaji Island across the Naruto Strait, which is famous for its whirlpools. The city is located in the easternmost part of the Sanuki Mountains.

Neighbouring municipalities 
Tokushima Prefecture
 Matsushige
 Kitajima
 Itano
Kagawa Prefecture
Higashikagawa

Climate
Naruto has a Humid subtropical climate (Köppen Cfa) characterized by warm summers and cool winters with light to no snowfall.  The average annual temperature in Naruto is 16.2 °C. The average annual rainfall is 1637 mm with September as the wettest month. The temperatures are highest on average in August, at around 26.7 °C, and lowest in January, at around 6.3 °C. Due to the Seto Inland Sea climate, rainfall is low despite being in Tokushima Prefecture.On August 6, 1923, a temperature of 42.5 ℃, which was the highest recorded temperature in Japan for many decades, was unofficially recorded in Naruto.

Demographics
Per Japanese census data, the population of Naruto has remained relatively steady over the past 50 years. In the quinquennial census of June 1, 2019, the city had a population of 56,222 (2005: 63,200).

History 
As with all of Tokushima Prefecture, the area of Naruto was part of ancient Awa Province.  During the Edo period, the area was part of the holdings of Tokushima Domain ruled by the Hachisuka clan from their seat at Tokushima Castle. The villages of Seto (瀬戸村), Naruto (鳴門村  Muya (撫養村), and Satoura (里浦村) were established within Itano District, Tokushima with the creation of the modern municipalities system on October 1, 1889.  Seto became a town on November 1, 1938, Naruto on April 1, 1940, and Muya on March 15, 1947. The four municipalities merged on March 15, 1947 to form the city of Narunan (鳴南市), which was renamed Naruto two months later on May 15, 1947.

Government
Naruto has a mayor-council form of government with a directly elected mayor and a unicameral city council of 22 members. Naruto contributes three members to the Tokushima Prefectural Assembly. In terms of national politics, the town is part of Tokushima 2nd district of the lower house of the Diet of Japan.

Economy
Naruto has a mixed economy of agriculture, commercial fishing, food processing and pharmaceuticals. In the past, the salt industry was thriving. Naruto was the origin of the  Otsuka Pharmaceutical Group and the Naruto Salt Industry, both of which still have a number of facilities in the city.

Education
Naruto has 13 public elementary schools and five public middle schools operated by the city government and two public high schools operated by the Tokushima Prefectural Department of Education. The Naruto University of Education is located in the city.

Transportation

Railway
 Shikoku Railway Company – Kōtoku Line
  - 
 Shikoku Railway Company – Naruto Line
  -  -  -  -  -  -

Highways 
  Tokushima Expressway
  Kobe-Awaji-Naruto Expressway

Sister city relations
 - Lüneburg, Germany since 1974
 - Qingdao, China, friendship city since 1999
 -Zhangjiajie, Hunan, China, friendship city since 2011

Local attractions
 Ryōzen-ji, 1st temple on the Shikoku Pilgrimage
 Gokuraku-ji, 2nd temple on the Shikoku Pilgrimage
 Tōrin-in
 Ōasahiko Jinja, ichinomiya of Awa Province
 Naruto whirlpools 
 Ōtsuka Museum of Art
 Ōnaruto Bridge
 Bandō prisoner-of-war camp, National Historic Site

Sports
Naruto has the home stadium of professional football team Tokushima Vortis and of baseball team Tokushima Indigo Socks.

Traditional arts 
 Ōtani-yaki

References

External links 
 
 
  
  
 Kitaro Shikoku Peace Bell Project

 
Cities in Tokushima Prefecture
Populated coastal places in Japan